Mars 1 was an early Soviet mission to Mars.

It may also refer to
Mars One, a proposed colony on Mars
Mars One (film), a 2022 Brazilian film 
Phobos (moon), a natural satellite of Mars, systemically designated Mars I
Mars Orbiter Mission, the first Indian Mars mission
Yinghuo-1, the first attempted Chinese mission to Mars
Tianwen-1 (formerly Huoxing-1 ), first Chinese space probe to reach Mars
, the first USS Mars
 (1665), the first HMS Mars
 the first volume of Fuyumi Soryo's Mars (manga)

See also
 Mars 1M, Soviet spacecraft
 Mars (disambiguation)
 Marsi (disambiguation)
 Marsone (disambiguation)